Benjamin I Parzybok (born 1970) is an American novelist. His debut novel, Couch, written in a six-month period while the author was living in Ecuador, was published in 2008 by Small Beer Press.

Benjamin Parzybok is the creator of Gumball Poetry, a (now defunct) journal published through gumball machines, the Psychic Book Project and the Black Magic Insurance Agency, a citywide mystery/treasure hunt. His projects have twice been selected as Best of Portland for the Willamette Week: "Best Guy Who Walks His Talk" and "Best Quarter's Worth of Culture."

Besides freelancing, his most recent start up is Walker Tracker, a walking community for pedometer enthusiasts.

He received a BA in creative writing from the Evergreen State College, Olympia, WA. He has lived in Brooklyn, Central America, Taiwan, R.O.C., Ecuador, up and down the Pacific Northwest, and now lives in Portland, Oregon, with the writer Laura Moulton and their two children. He is also the cousin of Lucas Parzybok, who has also successfully published a book.

Parzybok has cited influences including Haruki Murakami, Ursula Le Guin, and David Eddings.

Footnotes

References
 Baker, Jeff. (2008, November 13). "Benjamin Parzybok and the Art of Couch Moving". The Oregonian.
 Constant, Paul. (2008, November 13). "One Couch to Rule Them All." The Stranger, p. 29.
 Goodwin, Geoffrey H. (2009, January).  "An Interview With Benjamin Parzybok". Bookslut.
 Roberts, Dmae. (2008, November 12) Audio interview: "Dmae Roberts talks with Benjamin Parzybok about Couch: A Novel" on KBOO.fm. KBOO.fm.
 Tan, Charles A. (2009, February 17). "Interview: Ben Parzybok". Bibliophile Stalker.
 Small Beer Press author bio for Benjamin Parzybok.
 Booktour listing for Benjamin Parzybok.

Living people
1970 births
Writers from Portland, Oregon
Evergreen State College alumni
American male writers
American expatriates in Ecuador